opened in Esashi, Hokkaidō, Japan in 1999. Dedicated to the history and natural history of Esashi and the Sea of Okhotsk coast, the collection includes the Important Cultural Property Artefacts Excavated from the Menashidomari Site, Hokkaidō.

See also
 List of Historic Sites of Japan (Hokkaido)
 North Okhotsk Prefectural Natural Park
 Hokkaido Museum

References

External links

 Okhotsk Museum Esashi 

1999 establishments in Japan
Museums established in 1999
Museums in Hokkaido
Esashi, Hokkaido (Sōya)